The African Muzik Magazine Awards (commonly abbreviated as AFRIMMA) are an annual African music awards ceremony aimed to reward and celebrate musical works, talents and creativity around the African continent and accommodates all musical genres including Afrobeats, Afro-Trap, Assiko, Bongo, Coupé-décalé, Genge, Highlife, Kwaito, Lingala and Soukous.

History
The event was founded by Nigerian businessman Anderson Obiagwu and is presented by Big A Entertainment. The first awards ceremony took place in July 2014 at the Eisemann Center in Richardson, Texas.

Categories
The awards consist of 28 prizes overseeing the achievements of African artistes within their specific regions of origin and the genre-based continental awards.

 Best Male East Africa
 Best Female East Africa
 Best Newcomers
 Artist Of The Year
 Best Live Act
 Best Female Rap Act
 Best Male Rap Act
 Best Collaboration
 Song Of The Year
 Best Video Director
 Best DJ Africa
 Best African DJ Usa
 Afrimma Video Of The Year
 Music Producer Of The Year
 Best African Dancer
 Personality Of The Year
 Best Male Central Africa
 Best Female Central Africa
 Best Male Southern Africa
 Best Female Southern Africa
 Best Male North Africa
 Best Female North Africa
 Best Male West Africa
 Best Female West Africa
 Crossing Boundaries With Music Award
 Best Gospel
 Best Francophone
 Best Lusophone

References

External links

Awards established in 2014
International music awards
African music awards